Sandrine Fricot (born 4 June 1968 in Épinal) is a retired high jumper from France, who set her personal best on 8 June 1992, jumping 1.93 metres at a meet in Belfort. She is a two-time French national champion: 1992 and 1994.

References
 Women's World All-Time List
 French National Championships

French female high jumpers
Athletes (track and field) at the 1992 Summer Olympics
Olympic athletes of France
1968 births
Living people
Sportspeople from Épinal
20th-century French women